The 2010–11 HockeyAllsvenskan season was the sixth season of the HockeyAllsvenskan, the second level of ice hockey in Sweden. 14 teams participated in the league, and the top four qualified for the Kvalserien, with the opportunity to be promoted to the Elitserien.

Overview

Regular season

Standings

Post season

Pre-qualifiers

Kvalserien

Relegation round

External links

 Season on hockeyarchives.info

Swe
HockeyAllsvenskan seasons
2010–11 in Swedish ice hockey leagues